The Revenge of Blind Joe Death: The John Fahey Tribute Album is a tribute CD to guitarist John Fahey released in 2006 by Takoma Records.

History 
This John Fahey tribute album was produced by Jon Monday, former art director and later vice president and general manager of Fahey's label, Takoma Records. It contains a collection of interpretations of Fahey compositions and original compositions played in Fahey's style. All the performers were either friends, students, collaborators or label-mates of Fahey.

The final song, recorded to sound like a scratchy 78 rpm record, is credited to Blind Joe Death himself, Fahey's alter-ego during his early career. The actual performer is not revealed.

Reception

In his Allmusic review, critic Mark Deming praised the album and many of the performances, but also wrote "... the sense of creative adventure and musical risk that was so much a part of John Fahey's music is largely missing, and a number of the guitarists here offer renditions that are so close to the sound and style of the original that they seem almost pointless except as a show of technique..." and that it is "a well-intentioned labor of love, but its polished surfaces lack the edgy textures that were so important to Fahey's work"

Daniel Spicer of PopMatters singled out specific performances as "less successful" as others, but called the album "commendable and hugely enjoyable tribute to a unique giant of American music." He singles out George Winston's harmonica version of "Sally Goodin" as "a relentless, barrage of percussive blowing that whips up a dark vortex of drones and overtones, dragging the listener down to a tiny point of non-existence. It really must be heard to be believed."

Track listing

References

2006 compilation albums
Folk compilation albums
John Fahey (musician) tribute albums
Takoma Records albums